Barbara Gowdy, CM (born 25 June 1950) is a Canadian novelist and short story writer. Born in Windsor, Ontario, she is the long-time partner of poet Christopher Dewdney and resides in Toronto.

Literary career

Gowdy's novel Falling Angels (1989) was made into a film of the same name by director Scott Smith, from an adaptation written by Esta Spalding, in 2002. The comically dark novel focuses on a nuclear family in a 1960s Ontario suburb. The main characters are three sisters who come of age in a house run by their abusive and womanizing father and must constantly find ways to take care of their depressed and alcoholic mother. Gowdy says her inspiration for the book was the idea of a Canadian family living during the Cold War and practicing using their bomb shelter in the back yard. In the novel and movie, the family spend two weeks trapped in the bomb shelter as an "exercise" rather than going on a family trip to Disneyland.

Authors such as Alice Munro and Carol Shields look at the everyday, but the bulk of Gowdy's work reflects upon the opposite. Gowdy's stories look at the extreme, the strange and the abnormal, but she manages to make her characters both human and poignant. She often draws on magic realism as a writing style, combining the fantastic or unusual with realistic and believable descriptions, placing her within the tradition of Southern Ontario Gothic.

The narrator and main character of the title short story of her 1992 collection, We So Seldom Look On Love, for instance, is an assistant embalmer at a funeral home who makes love to the bodies of attractive young men before they are buried. The story was the inspiration for the 1996 Canadian independent film Kissed, directed by Lynne Stopkewich and starring Molly Parker. The story's name is taken from a line in the Frank O'Hara's poem "Ode on Necrophilia", and was inspired by a newspaper article Gowdy read about Karen Greenlee, a young California woman who hijacked a hearse on its way to a funeral, took the corpse of the young man inside the coffin to a motel room and had sex with it for several days before being caught by the police. The entire story collection deals with outsiders trying to find their place in the world and doing whatever they have to do achieve this end.  "The Two-Headed Man," for instance, features a man who removes his conjoined head and, therefore, either commits murder or suicide. A third story, "93 Million Miles Away" involves a woman who, in a desperate need to be seen and known, exposes herself through the window of her apartment to the doctor in an apartment across the lane. This story was made into the film Arousal.

Similarly, Gowdy's novel Mister Sandman revolves around the family of Joan, a young autistic girl with a savant talent for playing classical music on the piano. Gowdy's novel The White Bone is written from the perspective of African elephants. Subsequent novels The Romantic and Helpless deal with characters driven to extreme action by the force of their desires.

She wrote the short film screenplay Green Door, which was directed by Semi Chellas and released in 2008.

Recognition

Gowdy has been nominated, repeatedly, for every major Canadian book prize, including the Giller Prize (twice short-listed, once long-listed); the Governor General's Award (three-times short-listed); and the Rogers Writers' Trust Fiction Prize (twice-shorted listed). The Romantic was nominated for the Man Booker Prize. Helpless won the Trillium Book Award. All her books are bestsellers in Canada and Germany.  Carol Shields claimed in The Boston Globe that Gowdy "writes like an angel." The Chicago Tribune has called her "a miraculous writer."  And The Globe and Mail says, "Gowdy's is a peacemaking genius, unique in its talent for the translation of strangeness to second nature...."

She was appointed a member of the Order of Canada effective 5 October 2006.  In 2012, she won a John Simon Guggenheim Memorial Foundation Fellowship for her work.

Controversy
In June 2008, Gowdy's 2007 novel Helpless, which follows the stalking and kidnap of a nine-year-old girl, was abridged and adapted for BBC Radio 4's Book at Bedtime. This resulted in several listeners complaining that the novel was 'dark', 'disturbing' and had '(frightened) the life out of them'. Commissioning editor Caroline Raphael defended the BBC's choice stating "It is about a very difficult subject ... Unfortunately, writers do want to write about disturbing things" she also added unhappy listeners could simply "turn off".

Bibliography
 Through the Green Valley (1988) 
 Falling Angels (1989) 
 We So Seldom Look On Love (1992) 
 Mister Sandman (1995) 
 The White Bone (1999) 
 The Romantic (2003) 
 Helpless (2007)
Little Sister (2017)

References

External links
 
 Barbara Gowdy at The Canadian Encyclopedia
 HarperCollins Canada
 Interview from CBC Words at Large
 Archives of Barbara Gowdy (Barbara Gowdy fonds, R9334) are held at Library and Archives Canada

1950 births
Living people
Writers from Windsor, Ontario
20th-century Canadian novelists
21st-century Canadian novelists
Members of the Order of Canada
Canadian women novelists
Writers from Toronto
Canadian women short story writers
20th-century Canadian women writers
21st-century Canadian women writers
20th-century Canadian short story writers
21st-century Canadian short story writers